Lotte is a female given name. It is a diminutive of the names Lieselotte and Charlotte, which itself is a female form of the male name Charlot, a diminutive of Charles.

 Lotte Anker (born 1958), Danish jazz saxophonist and composer
 Lotte Backes (1901–1990), German pianist, organist and composer
 Lotte Bagge (born 1968), Danish footballer
 Lotte Berk (1913–2003), German-British dancer and teacher
 Lotte Brand Philip (1910–1986), German art historian and professor 
 Lotte Bruil-Jonathans (born 1977), Dutch female badminton player
 Lotte de Beer (born 1981), Dutch opera director
 Lotte Egging (born 1988), Dutch cricketer
 Lotte Eisner (1896–1983), French-German film historian
 Lotte Eriksen (born 1987), Norwegian squash player
 Lotte Flack (born 1994), German actress
 Lotte Friis (born 1988), Danish competitive swimmer 
 Lotte Glob (born 1944), Danish ceramic artist living in Scotland
 Lotte Grigel (born 1991), Danish handball player
 Lotte Hass (1928–2015), Austrian underwater diver, model and actress
 Lotte Hellinga (born 1932), Dutch literary historian
 Lotte Herrlich (1883–1956), German photographer
 Lotta Hitschmanova (1909–1990), Czech-Canadian humanitarian
 Lotte Hollands (born 1981), Dutch mathematical physicist
 Lotte Horne (born 1943), Danish film actress 
 Lotte Ingrisch (1930–2022), Austrian author and playwright
 Lotte Jacobi (1896–1990), German photographer
 Lotte Kiærskou (born 1975), Danish team handball player
 Lotte Koch (1913–2013), Belgian-German film actress
 Lotte Kopecky (born 1995), Belgian racing cyclist
 Lotte Lang (1900–1985), Austrian actress
 Lotte Laserstein (1898–1993), German-Swedish painter and portraitist
 Lotte Ledl (born 1930), Austrian actress
 Lotte Lehmann (1888–1976), German operatic soprano 
 Lotte Lenya (1898–1981), Austrian-American singer and actress
 Lotte Loewe (1900–19??), German chemist 
 Lotte Lorring (1893–1939), German actress
 Lotte Meitner-Graf (1899–1973), Austrian photographer
 Lotte Meldgaard Pedersen (born 1972), Danish match racing sailor
 Lotte Moos (1909–2008), German-American poet and playwright
 Lotte Motz (1922–1997), Austrian-American scholar 
 Lotte Munk (born 1969), Danish actress
 Lotte Neumann (1896–1977), German actress and screenwriter
 Lotte Nogler (born 1947), Italian alpine skier
 Lotte Olsen (born 1966), Danish badminton player
 Lotte Pusch (1890–1983), German physical chemist
 Lotte Rausch (1913–1995), German actress
 Lotte Reiniger (1899–1981), German (later British) silhouette animator and film director
 Lotte Salling (born 1964), Danish children's author 
 Lotte Schöne, (1891–1977), Austrian operatic soprano
 Lotte Smiseth Sejersted (born 1991), Norwegian alpine skier
 Lotte Specht (1911–2002), German footballer
 Lotte Spira (1883–1943), German actress
 Lotte Stam-Beese (1903-1988), German architect and urban planner
 Lotte Stein (1894–1982), German actress
 Lotte Strauss (1913–1985), German-American pathologist 
 Lotte Tarp (1945–2002),  Danish actress
 Lotte Toberentz (1900–19??), German concentration camp commandant
 Lotte Ulbricht (1903–2002), East German politician, former First Lady of East Germany
 Lotte van Beek (born 1991), Dutch speed skater
 Lotte van Hoek (born 1991), Dutch racing cyclist 
 Lotte Verbeek (born 1982), Dutch actress
 Lotte Wæver (born 1942), Danish actress and television presenter
 Lotte Wubben-Moy (born 1999), English footballer

Fictional characters 
Lotte Jansson, one of the main characters in the anime series Little Witch Academia
Lotte, the main character in the Estonian animated film series Lotte from Gadgetville and Lotte and the Moonstone Secret

See also

Lotta (name)
Lotten
Lotti (given name)
Lottie (name)

References

German feminine given names
Dutch feminine given names
Danish feminine given names
Estonian feminine given names
Norwegian feminine given names
Swedish feminine given names